"Cowboys and Angels" is a song written and performed by George Michael and released on Epic Records in 1991. It became the first single released by Michael to miss the top 40 of the UK Singles Chart, peaking at number 45 on release in March 1991.

The song's was the fifth single to be released from the Listen Without Prejudice Vol. 1 album. The album was released in the UK on 3 September 1990 and in the US on 11 September 1990; each single had finished lower than its predecessor and "Cowboys and Angels" continued the pattern, although the other four had all reached the threshold of the top 40.

"Cowboys and Angels" was also Michael's longest single to date, at 7 minutes 14 seconds. The saxophone solo is by Andy Hamilton. The song is notable for being written in waltz time.

In a 2004 interview with Adam Mattera for UK magazine Attitude, Michael revealed the song was about a short-lived love triangle where he was in love with a man while a female friend was in love with him, but none knew of the others' feelings: "She was in love with me because she couldn't get me, and I was in love with him because I couldn't get him... It's a very personal lyric, but it's about the ridiculousness of wanting what you can't have."

Track listing

The single included Something To Save as a b-side.  Some releases of the single also included a 4 minute 34-second radio edit of the song, which omitted a 42-second piano intro and an entire verse from the album version.

CD Single
 "Cowboys and Angels" – 7:14
 "Cowboys and Angels" (Radio Edit) - 4:34
 "Something To Save" - 3:18

Charts

References

George Michael songs
1991 singles
Songs written by George Michael
Song recordings produced by George Michael
Pop ballads
Epic Records singles
1990 songs